The Hotel Stockton is a Mission Revival Style building located at 133 E. Weber Ave. in Stockton, California. The hotel, which opened in 1910, was designed as a grand hotel with 252 rooms and became popular among visitors to Stockton, especially traveling entertainers. In 1912, the City of Stockton moved its City Hall into the hotel, where it remained until 1926. The building's role in local government ultimately outlasted its role as a hotel; when the hotel closed for business in 1960, the county courthouse relocated to the building for the next four years while a new courthouse was built. The building served yet another branch of government in 1976, when San Joaquin County purchased the building as office space for its Public Administration Department.

The Hotel Stockton was added to the National Register of Historic Places on April 1, 1981.

See also
Stockton waterfront near the Hotel

References

External links

Hotel buildings on the National Register of Historic Places in California
Government buildings on the National Register of Historic Places in California
Mission Revival architecture in California
Government buildings completed in 1910
Buildings and structures in Stockton, California
Hotel buildings completed in 1910
National Register of Historic Places in San Joaquin County, California